1179 Mally, provisional designation , is an asteroid and long-lost minor planet from the central region of the asteroid belt, approximately 13 kilometers in diameter. Discovered by Max Wolf in 1931, the asteroid was lost until its rediscovery in 1986. The discoverer named it after his daughter-in-law, Mally Wolf.

Discovery and rediscovery 

Mally was discovered on 19 March 1931, by German astronomer Max Wolf at Heidelberg Observatory in southwest Germany.

Soon after its initial discovery, it became one of few well known lost minor planets for over 55 years. In 1986, Mally was rediscovered by astronomers Lutz Schmadel, Richard Martin West and Hans-Emil Schuster, who remeasured the original discovery plates and computed alternative search ephemerides. This allowed them to find the body very near to its predicted position. In addition, historic photographic plates from the Palomar Sky Survey (1956–1958), the UK Schmidt Telescope (Australia), and the ESO Schmidt Telescope (Chile) confirmed the rediscovery.

Orbit and classification 

Mally orbits the Sun in the central main-belt at a distance of 2.2–3.1 AU once every 4 years and 3 months (1,548 days). Its orbit has an eccentricity of 0.17 and an inclination of 9° with respect to the ecliptic. The body's observation arc begins with its official discovery observation at Heidelberg in 1931.

Physical characteristics

Diameter and albedo 

According to the surveys carried out by the Japanese Akari satellite and the NEOWISE mission of NASA's Wide-field Infrared Survey Explorer, Mally measures between 11.20 and 16.60 kilometers in diameter, and its surface has an albedo between 0.059 and 0.097.

The Collaborative Asteroid Lightcurve Link assumes an albedo of 0.10 – a compromise value between the brighter stony (0.20) and darker carbonaceous asteroids (0.057) used for bodies with a semi-major axis between 2.6 and 2.7 AU – and calculates a diameter of 10.7 kilometers based on an absolute magnitude of 12.98.

Rotation period 

In September 2013, a rotational lightcurve of Mally was obtained from photometric observations taken at the Palomar Transient Factory in California. The fragmentary lightcurve gave a longer than average rotation period of 46.6 hours with a brightness variation of 0.08 magnitude. However, the obtained result is poorly rated by CALL.

Naming 

This minor planet was named after Mally Wolf, wife of Franz Wolf and the discoverer's daughter-in-law. The official naming citation was published by Paul Herget in The Names of the Minor Planets in 1955.

References

External links 
 (1179) Mally, at AstDyS, University of Pisa
 Asteroid Lightcurve Database (LCDB), query form (info )
 Dictionary of Minor Planet Names, Google books
 Asteroids and comets rotation curves, CdR – Observatoire de Genève, Raoul Behrend
 Discovery Circumstances: Numbered Minor Planets (1)-(5000) – Minor Planet Center
 
 

001179
Discoveries by Max Wolf
Named minor planets
19310319